Mark A. Ediger is a retired lieutenant general in the United States Air Force who was the twenty-second Surgeon General of the United States Air Force. Prior to that he served as the Deputy Surgeon General.

Education 
 1977 Bachelor's degree in chemistry, University of Missouri, Kansas City
 1978 Doctor of Medicine degree, University of Missouri, Kansas City
 1981 Residency in family practice, Wake Forest University, Winston-Salem, N.C.
 1991 Master of Public Health degree, UTHealth School of Public Health, San Antonio

Assignments 
1. June 1986 – August 1988, Chief, Family Practice, Air Transportable Hospital Commander, 1st Medical Group, Langley AFB, Va.

2. August 1988 – July 1990, Flight Surgeon and Chief, Flight Medicine, 94th Fighter Squadron, Langley AFB, Va.

3. July 1990 – July 1992, Resident in Aerospace Medicine, USAF School of Aerospace Medicine, Brooks AFB, Texas

4. July 1992 – July 1994, Chief, Aeromedical Services, 325th Medical Group, Tyndall AFB, Fla.

5. July 1994 – July 1996, Chief, Aerospace Medicine Branch, and Chief, Professional Services Division, Headquarters Air Education and Training Command, Randolph AFB, Texas

6. July 1996 – July 1998, Chief, Aerospace Medicine Division, Air Force Medical Operations Agency, Bolling AFB, D.C.

7. July 1998 – July 2000, Command Surgeon, Air Force Special Operations Command, Hurlburt Field, Fla.

8. July 2000 – June 2002, Commander, 16th Medical Group, Hurlburt Field, Fla.

9. June 2002 – July 2003, Commander, 363rd Expeditionary Medical Group, Southwest Asia

10. July 2003 – July 2007, Command Surgeon, Headquarters U.S. Air Forces in Europe, Ramstein Air Base, Germany

11. July 2007 – September 2008, Command Surgeon, Headquarters Air Education and Training Command, Randolph AFB, Texas

12. September 2008 – July 2012, Commander, Air Force Medical Operations Agency, Lackland AFB, Texas

13. July 2012 – June 2015, Deputy Surgeon General, Headquarters U.S. Air Force, Washington, D.C.

14. June 2015 – June 2018, Surgeon General, Headquarters U.S. Air Force, Washington, D.C.

Awards and decorations

References

External links

Living people
University of Missouri–Kansas City alumni
UTHealth School of Public Health alumni
Surgeons General of the United States Air Force
Recipients of the Defense Superior Service Medal
Year of birth missing (living people)